Stade John Girardin is a multi-use stadium in Saint-Pierre, Saint-Pierre and Miquelon, France.  It is currently used mostly for football matches.  The stadium is used by the Saint Pierre and Miquelon national football team.

External links
  Equipements sportifs et culturels à Saint Pierre (97500)

Football venues in France
Football venues in Saint Pierre and Miquelon
Saint-Pierre, Saint Pierre and Miquelon